Pazaryolu  is a town and district of Erzurum Province in the Eastern Anatolia region of Turkey. The mayor is Recep Kaplan (AKP). The population is 1,681 (as of 2010).

References

Populated places in Erzurum Province
Districts of Erzurum Province